is a Japanese former competitive figure skater. She won two gold medals on the ISU Junior Grand Prix series and placed fourth at the 2003 and 2004 World Junior Championships. She made her senior international debut at the 2006 Four Continents Championships, where she placed sixth. 

Asada studied ballet before taking up skating at the age of eight or nine. She is the elder sister of Mao Asada, a three-time World champion and the 2010 Olympic silver medalist.

Asada has worked as a model and TV presenter.

Programs

Competitive highlights

References

External links

  
 

1988 births
Living people
Figure skaters from Nagoya
Japanese female single skaters
Japanese female models